The 2012 Amstel Gold Race was the 47th running of the Amstel Gold Race, a single-day cycling race.

The race was won by  rider Enrico Gasparotto after outsprinting several of his rivals to the finish on the Cauberg; it was his first Classics victory, and the first by an Italian rider in a one-day classic since Damiano Cunego won the 2008 Giro di Lombardia. Second place went to 's Jelle Vanendert, while Peter Sagan rounded out the podium placings for the  team. Two-time defending race winner Philippe Gilbert finished in the same time as Sagan, but was classified in sixth place.

Teams
As the Amstel Gold Race was a UCI World Tour event, all 18 UCI ProTeams were invited automatically and obligated to send a squad. Six other squads were given wildcard places into the race, and as such, formed the event's 24-team peloton.

The 24 teams that competed in the race were:

Results

References

External links

Amstel Gold Race
2012 UCI World Tour
2012 in Dutch sport